Norwegians in Finland are immigrants born in Norway, citizens of Norway or speakers of the Norwegian language living in Finland.

History
In 1872, Hans Gutzeit, a Norwegian, founded a sawmill in Kotka, which grew to be Stora Enso, which still operates. Gutzeit brought at least 200 sawmill workers from Norway, of which some brought their family as well. Many of them settled in Finland permanently, and established communities in the middle of Finnish rural regions. Mass migration was rare in Finland until this point. Norwegians had a significant impact in Kotka. In 1875 there were 130-140 Norwegians in Kotka, one sixth of the population. Norwegians also established communities in Oulu, and founded several sawmills across Finland. Norwegians had an notable presence in Kemi. The tenth Finnish President Martti Ahtisaari is a descendant of the sawmill workers.

Finns had an hatred towards Norwegians, since they had a higher pay and a higher position in the society. Norwegians usually didn't pay taxes. In the 1920s and 1930s, most Norwegians acquired Finnish citizenship. In 1882, Norwegians started to be assimilated into the Finnish culture. However, Finns with Norwegian ancestry still retain their Norwegian identity.

Demographics

According to the International migrant stock: The 2017 revision, there were 2,156 Norwegian immigrants living in Finland. Most of them live in Helsinki, Oulu and Northern Finland.

They make the most in Utsjoki (2.65%), Larsmo (0.77%) and Enontekiö (0.69%).

Of the Norwegian citizens, 58.8% are male. 337 Norwegian men are in a registered relationship with a Finnish woman. 45.4% of Norwegians are employed, 7.7% unemployed and 46.9% outside the labour force. Of the labour force, 85.6% are employed and 14.4% unemployed. There were 44 Norwegian entrepreneurs in 2017.

Norwegian language in Finland
The northernmost municipalities of Finland (Inari, Enontekiö and Utsjoki) want to increase teaching of the Norwegian language in schools. The school curriculum however doesn't include Norwegian and it can only be learned as an optional subject. Enontekiö tries to get Norwegian to be included in the school curriculum, since the inhabitants of Enontekiö have many connections and bonds to Norway. In Ivalo ala-aste, 56 pupils learn Norwegian. Oulu considers making Norwegian one of the official languages. Norwegian can be learned several colleges.

Finnish people of Norwegian descent

 Marko Ahtisaari, technology entrepreneur and musician
 Martti Ahtisaari, politician
 Leif Wager, actor
 Elisabeth Nauclér, politician and jurist
 , businessman

See also 
 Finland–Norway relations

References

Ethnic groups in Finland
Finland–Norway relations